Potassium aluminium borate (K2Al2B2O7) is an ionic compound composed of potassium ions, aluminium ions, and borate ions. Its crystal form exhibits nonlinear optical properties. The ultraviolet beam at 266 nm can be obtained by fourth harmonic generation (FGH) of 1064 nm Nd:YAG laser radiation through a nonlinear crystal K2Al2B2O7 (KABO).

References

Nonlinear optical materials
Borates
Potassium compounds
Aluminium compounds
Crystals